This is the list of universities in Italy, sorted in ascending order by the name of the city where they are situated.

List of universities

Source: MIUR, Anagrafe Nazionale Studenti (Academic year 2012/2013)

Regional distribution 

Source: MIUR, Anagrafe Nazionale Studenti (Academic year 2010/2011)

National rankings

Anvur Rankings

Censis Rankings

International rankings

See also
 Higher education in Italy
 List of colleges and universities by country
 List of colleges and universities
 List of schools in Italy
 Open access in Italy

References 

 
 
Italy
Italy